Nueva Loja, also known as Lago Agrio, is the capital of the province of Sucumbíos in Ecuador. It was founded in the 1960s as a base camp of Texaco. The official population as of the 2010 census is 57,727.

Overview
Nueva Loja is located in central Sucumbíos, in the Amazonian forest, and is one of the most important cities in northeastern Ecuador. Its importance comes from the oil extraction. It is named after Loja as many of the first colonizers came from the Southern Province of Loja.

The area around the city, the Lago Agrio oil field, has many ecological problems. The rainforest has been all but obliterated in this region and environmental degradation is severe, with catastrophic oil pollution in some areas. On February 14, 2011, a judge in Lago Agrio ruled that Chevron, now owner of Texaco, had to pay $9 billion in environmental damages for polluting the rainforest.

In 2017, the Superior Court of Justice of Brasil rejected enforcement of the 2013 Ecuadorian Supreme Court award, with the Prosecutor concluding that verdict was “issued in an irregular manner, especially under deplorable acts of corruption.”

In 2018 the Permanent Court of Arbitration in The Hague ruled in favor of Chevron and said the 2013 Ecuador Supreme Court case was obtained "through fraud, bribery and corruption."

Manchester United Right Back Antonio Valencia was born in Nueva Loja.

Air transport
The city is served by Lago Agrio Airport, with daily flights from/to Quito.

Climate
Nueva Loja has a tropical rainforest climate (Af) with heavy to very heavy rainfall year-round.

See also
Lago Agrio oil field

References

Populated places in Sucumbíos Province
Company towns
Provincial capitals in Ecuador